Monooxygenases are enzymes that incorporate one hydroxyl group  (−OH) into substrates in many metabolic pathways. In this reaction, the two atoms of dioxygen are reduced to one hydroxyl group and one H2O molecule by the concomitant oxidation of NAD(P)H.  One important subset of the monooxygenases, the cytochrome P450 omega hydroxylases, is used by cells to metabolize arachidonic acid (i.e. eicosatetraenoic acid) to the cell signaling molecules, 20-hydroxyeicosatetraenoic acid or to reduce or totally inactivate the activate signaling molecules for example by hydroxylating leukotriene B4 to 20-hydroxy-leukotriene B5, 5-hydroxyeicosatetraenoic acid to 5,20-dihydroxyeicosatetraenoic acid, 5-oxo-eicosatetraenoic acid to 5-oxo-20-hydroxyeicosatetraenoic acid, 12-hydroxyeicosatetraenoic acid to 12,20-dihydroxyeicosatetraenoic acid, and epoxyeicosatrienoic acids to 20-hydroxy-epoxyeicosatrienoic acids.

Classification
They are classified as  oxidoreductase enzymes that catalyzes an electron transfer.

Related structures
2XDO
2XYO
2Y6R

Human proteins containing this domain 
COQ6;      CYP450;      MICAL1;    MICAL2;    MICAL2PV1; MICAL2PV2; MICAL3;

See also
ABM domain

References

External links
 

Protein domains
Enzymes